Education Review is an open-access academic journal publishing reviews of books in the field of education. It was established in 1998 by Gene V. Glass, Nicholas Burbules (University of Illinois at Urbana–Champaign), and Kate Corby (Michigan State University). The journal publishes peer-reviewed essay reviews and reviews of scholarly books. Reviews of books published in Spanish and Portuguese are also published. Reviews in English were edited by Glass (from 1998 to 2012) and co-editor Melissa Cast-Brede (University of Nebraska at Omaha). They were succeeded in 2012 by David J. Blacker (University of Delaware). Reviews in Spanish or Portuguese are edited by Gustavo Fischman (Arizona State University). Education Review publishes approximately 250 reviews each year. Education Review is currently published by the Mary Lou Fulton Teachers College at Arizona State University.

External links
 

Education journals
Open access journals
Publications established in 1998
Multilingual journals